Bamunara is a village in Bhatar CD block in Bardhaman Sadar North subdivision of Purba Bardhaman district in the state of West Bengal, India.

Demographics
The total geographic area of village is 306.24 hectares. Bamunara features a total population of 2,051 peoples. There are about 540 houses in Bamunara village. Ratanpur is nearest village to Bamunara which is approximately 2 km away.

Population and house data

Transport

See also
 Kumarun
 Narayanpur

References 

Villages in Purba Bardhaman district